Niantic is a census-designated place (CDP) and village in the town of East Lyme, Connecticut in the United States. The population was 3,114 at the 2010 census. It is located on Long Island Sound, the Millstone Nuclear Power Plant in nearby Waterford is visible on the bay's eastern horizon line, Rocky Neck State Park is also located in the area. Niantic was once famous for its Niantic River scallops, but the scallop population has been in decline for a number of years.

Geography
According to the United States Census Bureau, the CDP has a total area of 3.5 square miles (9.1 km2), of which 1.5 square miles (3.8 km2) is land and 2.1 square miles (5.4 km2), or 58.64%, is water.

Demographics
As of the census of 2000, there were 3,085 people, 1,404 households, and 835 families residing in the CDP. The racial makeup of the CDP was 96.63% White, 0.49% African American, 0.16% Native American, 1.23% Asian, 0.42% from other races, and 1.07% from two or more races. Hispanic or Latino of any race were 2.11% of the population.

There were 1,404 households, out of which 24.6% had children under the age of 18 living with them, 46.3% were married couples living together, 10.5% had a female householder with no husband present, and 40.5% were non-families. 33.4% of all households were made up of individuals, and 11.7% had someone living alone who was 65 years of age or older.  The average household size was 2.20 and the average family size was 2.81.

In the CDP, the population was spread out, with 20.3% under the age of 18, 5.9% from 18 to 24, 29.0% from 25 to 44, 27.0% from 45 to 64, and 17.8% who were 65 years of age or older.  The median age was 42 years. For every 100 females, there were 91.3 males.  For every 100 females age 18 and over, there were 89.7 males.

The median income for a household in the CDP was $54,872, and the median income for a family was $65,077. Males had a median income of $46,887 versus $35,811 for females. The per capita income for the CDP was $27,306.  About 1.9% of families and 3.6% of the population were below the poverty line, including 7.2% of those under age 18 and 1.8% of those age 65 or over.

According to www.city-data.com, the median income for a household in 2008 was $74,348, higher than the median income for the entire state of Connecticut ($68,595 in 2008). The median of all housing units in Niantic was $337,612 in 2008.

Notable residents
William Bryden (1880–1972), U.S. Army major general
William Colepaugh (1918–2005), Nazi sympathizer who grew up on Black Point and traveled to Germany in 1944 to be trained as a spy
Tom Danielson (1978–), former professional road bicycle racer
Rajai Davis (1980–), baseball player with multiple ball clubs
Charles Drake (real name "Charles Ruppert") (1917–1994), actor in over 80 films and numerous television shows
Otto Graham (1921–2003), Hall of Fame professional football player
John McDonald, Major League Baseball player with multiple ball clubs
Jeremy Powers, professional racing cyclist riding for Jelly Belly (cycling team)
Jay Allen Sanford, author and cartoonist best known as the co-creator of the comic book Rock 'N' Roll Comics, and for his work with Revolutionary Comics, Carnal Comics, and the San Diego Reader
William Nathan Harrell Smith (1812–1889), congressman from North Carolina; attended schools in East Lyme
Ed Toth, professional musician currently with The Doobie Brothers, formerly with Vertical Horizon and Jennifer Culture
Vladimir Peter Tytla (1904–1968), known as Bill Tytla, one of the original Disney animators
Pete Walker, professional baseball player with several teams; currently a Toronto Blue Jays coach

See also 

 East Lyme, Connecticut
 Niantic people, namesake tribe
 SS Niantic Victory

References

External links
 Niantic Bay Yacht Club. Official site.

East Lyme, Connecticut
Census-designated places in New London County, Connecticut
Populated coastal places in Connecticut
Connecticut placenames of Native American origin
Villages in Connecticut
Villages in New London County, Connecticut
Census-designated places in Connecticut